was the forty-third of the fifty-three stations (shukuba) of the Tōkaidō connecting Edo with Kyoto in Edo period Japan. It was  located in former Ise Province in what is now part of the city of Yokkaichi, Mie Prefecture, Japan.

History
Yokkaichi-juku was a post town located on the intersection between the Tōkaidō and the Ise Sangū Kaidō, one of the main highways for pilgrims to the Ise Grand Shrines, and developed as a market town from the Muromachi period, noted for holding a market on the days ending in "four" of each month. The earliest recorded market was in 1470. Under the Tokugawa shogunate, Yokkaichi was tenryō territory under direct control of the Shōgun, and administered by a daikan based at the town. It was also possible for travelers to take a ferry from here to Miya-juku, thus bypassing Kuwana-juku.

It had one Tonyaba, for the stabling of packhorses and warehousing of goods, and one kōsatsu for the display of official notifications. The name was  play on words, indicating that the confectionery "kept for a long time" and also "kept one fun for a long time". 

Yokkaichi-juku was 12.8 km from Kuwana-juku, the preceding post town and 389.6 kilometers from Edo.

Yokkaichi-juku in The Fifty-three Stations of the Tōkaidō
Utagawa Hiroshige's ukiyo-e Hōeidō edition print of Yokkaichi-juku dates from 1833 -1834. The print illustrates a windy day with a man racing after his hat, which has been blown away by the wind and another man crosses a small bridge over the Sanju River, depicted here as a small stream. The post town is depicted as a small collection of huts in the middle of a marsh, almost hidden by the reeds.

Neighboring Post Towns
Tōkaidō
Kuwana-juku - Yokkaichi-juku - Ishiyakushi-juku

Further reading

Carey, Patrick. Rediscovering the Old Tokaido:In the Footsteps of Hiroshige. Global Books UK (2000). 
Chiba, Reiko. Hiroshige's Tokaido in Prints and Poetry. Tuttle. (1982) 
Taganau, Jilly. The Tokaido Road: Travelling and Representation in Edo and Meiji Japan. RoutledgeCurzon (2004).

External links

THE WOODBLOCK PRINTS OF UTAGAWA HIROSHIGE The Great Tōkaidō
City home page 

Stations of the Tōkaidō
Stations of the Tōkaidō in Mie Prefecture
Ise Province
Yokkaichi